Wisconsin Rebels were an American soccer team, founded in 1998, originally as the Fox River Rebels. The team was a member of the United Soccer Leagues Premier Development League (PDL), the fourth tier of the American Soccer Pyramid, until 2004, when the team left the league and the franchise was terminated.

The Rebels played their home games at Calder Stadium in the city of Menasha, Wisconsin, 105 miles north of the state's largest city, Milwaukee. The team's colors were green, white and black.

Year-by-year

Coaches
  Kris Kelderman 2000
  James Huff 2001

Stadia
 Calder Stadium, Menasha, Wisconsin 2003–04
 Waupaca Stadium, Waupaca, Wisconsin 2003 (1 game)
 Portage County Youth Soccer Complex, Stevens Point, Wisconsin 2004 (1 game)

References

Soccer clubs in Wisconsin
Defunct Premier Development League teams
Association football clubs established in 1998
Association football clubs disestablished in 2004
1998 establishments in Wisconsin
2004 disestablishments in Wisconsin
Winnebago County, Wisconsin